Nanjing Olympic Suning Tower is a skyscraper on-hold in Nanjing, Jiangsu, China. It was expected to be completed in 2017 but was put on hold. The building site was near to Nanjing Olympic Sports Centre. Construction restarted in 2020 and its new planned completion date is 2025.

References

Buildings and structures under construction in China
Skyscraper office buildings in Nanjing
Residential skyscrapers in China
Skyscraper hotels in Nanjing
Skyscrapers in Nanjing